The Brazil men's national water polo team represents Brazil in international men's water polo competitions and friendly matches.

Results

Olympic Games

 1920 – 6th place
 1932 – disqualified
 1952 – 9th place
 1960 – 12th place
 1964 – 13th place
 1968 – 13th place
 1984 – 12th place
 2016 – 8th place

World Championship

 1986 – 12th place
 1998 – 12th place
 2001 – 13th place
 2003 – 13th place
 2009 – 13th place
 2011 – 14th place
 2015 – 10th place
 2017 – 12th place
 2019 – 13th place
 2022 – 15th place

FINA World League

 2002 – 8th place
 2003 – 8th place
 2004 – 8th place
 2005 – Preliminary round
 2006 – 12th place
 2010 – 16th place
 2012 – 8th place
 2013 – 8th place
 2014 – 7th place
 2015 –  Bronze medal
 2016 – 7th place

Pan American Games

 1951 –  Silver medal
 1955 –  Bronze medal
 1959 –  Bronze medal
 1963 –  Gold medal
 1967 –  Silver medal
 1971 – 4th place
 1975 – Did not participate
 1979 – 6th place
 1983 – 4th place
 1987 –  Bronze medal
 1991 –  Bronze medal
 1995 –  Silver medal
 1999 – 4th place
 2003 –  Silver medal
 2007 –  Silver medal
 2011 –  Bronze medal
 2015 –  Silver medal
 2019 –  Bronze medal

UANA Cup (ASUA Cup)

 2011 –  Silver medal
 2013 –  Bronze medal
 2015 –  Silver medal
 2017 –  Gold medal
 2019 –  Gold medal

Summer Universiade
 1963 –  Bronze medal

South American Swimming Championships

 2006 –  Gold medal
 2008 –  Gold medal
 2012 –  Silver medal
 2014 –  Gold medal

Team

Current squad
Roster for the 2019 World Championships.

Head coach: Rick Azavedo

Squads

 1951 Pan American Games –  Silver Medal
Alfonso Zaparoli, Armando João Caropresco, Claudino Caiado de Castro, Edson Perri, Guilherme Schall, Isaac dos Santos Moraes, João Havelange, Leo Rossi, Luiz Antonio dos Santos, Milton Busin, Nelson Brescia, Samuel Schemberg, and Saverio Gregorut.
 1955 Pan American Games –  Bronze Medal
Adhemar Grijó Filho, Amaury Fonseca, Denir Freitas Ribeiro, Edson Perri, Eduardo Antonio Alijó, Everaldo Luiz A. Cruz, Hilton de Almeida, Márvio Kelly dos Santos, Roberto Lara de Araújo, Rodney Stuart Bell, and Rolf Egon Kesterner.
 1959 Pan American Games –  Bronze Medal
Adhemar Grijó Filho, Everardo Luiz Cruz Filho, Flávio Ribeiro Ratto, Hilton de Almeida, João Gonçalves Filho, Luiz Daniel, Márvio Kelly dos Santos, Paulo Bruzzi Cochrane, Rodney Stuart Bell, and Sylvio Kelly dos Santos.
 1963 Pan American Games –  Gold Medal
Adhemar Grijó Filho, Aladar Szabo, Flávio Ribeiro Ratto, Ivo Kesselring Carotini, João Gonçalves Filho, Luiz Carlos A. Valim, Luiz Daniel, Luiz Euardo P. Lima, Marvio Kelly dos Santos, and Paulo Kesselring Carotini.
 1967 Pan American Games –  Silver Medal
João Gonçalves Filho, Ivo Kesselring Carotini, Henrique Fillelini, Luiz Eduardo P. Lima, Claudio Rinaldi C. Lima, Pedro Pinciroli Jr., Arnaldo Marsili, Marcos Vargas da Costa, Rodney Stuart Bell, and Paulo Kesselring Carotini.
 1984 Olympic Games – 12th place
Roberto Borelli, Orlando Chaves, Paulo Abreu, Carlos Carvalho, Silvio Manfredi, Solon Santos, Ricardo Tonieto, Eric Tebbe Borges, Mario Souto, Mario Sergio Lotufo, Fernando Carsalade, Helio Silva, and André Campos. Head Coach: Edson Perri
 1987 Pan American Games –  Bronze Medal
Ayrton P. C. Silva, Eduardo R. V. Comini, Eric T. Borges, Fernando Rocha Filho, Fernando Carsalade, Francisco Chaves Neto, Gilberto Gargiulo, Gilberto Guimarães, Hélio F. Gomes Filho, João Meireles, Mario E. A. Souto, Sergio S. Figueiredo Jr., and Silvio Manfredi.
 1991 Pan American Games –  Bronze Medal
Antonio Carlos Costa, Armando Gutfreund, Daniel Polidoro Mameri, Eduardo Vale Comini, Eric Tebbe Borges, Fernando Alberto Rocha Filho, Giuliano Bertolucci, Hélio Frederico Gomes Filho, João Antonio Meireles, Paulo Francisco J. Abreu, Paulo R. Vale Comini, Roberto Bruno S. Chiappini, and Rodney Andrew Bell.
 1995 Pan American Games –  Silver Medal
Adriano Marsili, Alexandre Miguel Lopes, Armando Gutfreund, Daniel Mameri, Diogo Freitas, Erik Seegerer, Guilherme Pinciroli, Michel Vieira, Paulo César Fernandes, Ricardo Perrone, Roberto Chiappini, Rodrigo Fernandes, and Yansel Galindo.
 2003 World Championship – 13th place
Fábio Chiquidimo, André Cordeiro, Yansel Galindo, Vicente Henriques, Alexandre Lopez, Leandro Ruiz Machado, Daniel Mameri, Felipe Perrone, Gabriel Reis, Rodrigo dos Santos, Roberto Seabra, Erik Seegerer, and André Raposo. Head Coach: Carlos Carvalho.
 2003 Pan American Games –  Silver Medal
André Capiberibe, André Cordeiro, Yansel Galindo, André Raposo, Felipe Perrone, Daniel Mameri, Erik Seegerer, Fábio Chiquidimo, Gabriel Reis, Leandro Ruiz Machado, Roberto Seabra, Rodrigo dos Santos, and Vicente Henriques. Head Coach: Carlos Carvalho
 2004 Olympic Qualifying Tournament – 7th place
Marcelo Chagas, André Cordeiro, Felipe Franco, Leandro Ruiz Machado, Daniel Mameri, Rafael Murad, Felipe Perrone, Gabriel Reis, João Santos, Rodrigo dos Santos, Roberto Seabra, Erik Seegerer, and Felipe Silva. Head Coach: Carlos Carvalho.
 2007 Pan American Games –  Silver Medal
André Cordeiro, André Raposo, Bruno Nolasco, Daniel Mameri, Erik Seegerer, Felipe Franco, Gabriel Reis, Leandro Ruiz Machado, Lucas Vita, Luís Santos, Roberto Seabra, Rodrigo dos Santos, and Vicente Henriques. Head Coach: Barbaro Diaz
 2008 Olympic Qualifying Tournament – 9th place
Conrado Bertoluzzi, Mario Carotini, Rafael Farias, Marcelo Franco, Vicente Henriques, Bruno Nolasco, Gabriel Reis, Bernardo Rocca, Luís Santos, Erik Seegerer, Felipe Silva, Anderson Souza, and Lucas Vita. Head Coach: Barbaro Dias.
 2011 Pan American Games –  Bronze Medal
 Henrique Carvalho, João Coelho, Danilo Correa, Jonas Crivella, Marcelo das Chagas, Felipe Silva (water polo), Luís dos Santos, Marcelo Franco, Ruda Franco, Gustavo Guimarães, Bernardo Rocha, Gabriel Rocha, and Emilio Vieira.
 2015 FINA World League –  Bronze Medal
Adrià Delgado, Bernardo Gomes, Bernardo Rocha, Felipe Perrone, Felipe Silva (water polo), Guilherme Gomes, Gustavo Guimarães, Ives Alonso, Jonas Crivella, Josip Vrlić, Paulo Salemi, Thyê Bezerra, and Vinicius Antonelli.
 2015 Pan American Games –  Silver Medal
Adrià Delgado, Bernardo Gomes, Bernardo Rocha, Felipe Perrone, Felipe Silva (water polo), Guilherme Gomes, Gustavo Guimarães, Ives Alonso, Jonas Crivella, Josip Vrlić, Paulo Salemi, Thyê Bezerra, and Vinicius Antonelli.

Notable players
Adrià Delgado
Felipe Perrone (later Spain)
Ricardo Perrone (later Spain)

See also
 Brazil men's Olympic water polo team records and statistics
 Brazil women's national water polo team

References

CBDA

External links
Official website

Men's national water polo teams
 
Water polo
Men's sport in Brazil